Benjamin Patton (born 28 July 1965) is an author, filmmaker and film educator in New York City. He is the founder and executive director of the Patton Veterans Project nonprofit and CEO of Patton Productions, LLC, a video production company.

Biography 
He is the youngest son of George Patton IV and grandson of General George S. Patton. With Jennifer Scruby, he is the co-author of Growing Up Patton: Reflections on Heroes, History and Family Wisdom.

Patton married Blair Emily Miller on 15 September 2018.

Filmography

References

External links
 I Was There Films official web site

1965 births
Living people
American non-fiction writers
People from Boston
People from Hamilton, Massachusetts
Patton family
American chief executives